Azariea was a region along the southern coast of ancient Sicily visible across the straits from Africa due to its mountainous nature. The area was mythologized as in its entry into Latin it lost an "A" and was miswritten, resulting in the variable Zaric or Zarec.
Its appearance in mythology is under Zarec Mountains.

Not to be confused with the more phonetic Azaria, in Israel, or Uzziah of Judah, variously known as Azaria(h).

Ancient Sicily